Self-learning can refer to:
 Autodidacticism
 Learning theory (education)
 Night self-learning
 Unsupervised learning, a kind of machine learning